Shirley Mills is an unincorporated village in the town of Shirley, Piscataquis County, Maine, United States. Shirley Mills had a post office until June 20, 1986; it still has its own ZIP code, 04485.

References

Villages in Piscataquis County, Maine
Villages in Maine